Hans Schmidt (2 November 1887 – 9 July 1916) was a German footballer who played as an outside right and made one appearance for the Germany national team.

Career
Schmidt earned his first and only cap for Germany on 7 June 1908 in a friendly against Austria. The away match, which was played in Vienna, finished as a 2–3 loss for Germany.

Personal life
Schmidt died on 9 July 1916 in World War I at the age of 28.

Career statistics

International

References

General references

External links
 
 
 
 
 

1887 births
1916 deaths
Footballers from Berlin
German footballers
Germany international footballers
Association football outside forwards
BFC Germania 1888 players
German military personnel killed in World War I